Psilochorus is a genus of spiders in the family Pholcidae.

Description
The abdomen of Psilochorus species is humped and oval. The eight eyes are located in two rows.

Distribution
Most described species are found in the New World, especially from Mexico and the United States, but other species occur in South America. P. simoni is found only in Europe. P. nigromaculatus was described from New Guinea, but is certainly misplaced.

Name
The first part of the genus name is from Ancient Greek psilos "naked". The second part could be derived from a Greek word for "dance", or "separate".

Species
 Psilochorus acanthus Chamberlin & Ivie, 1942 — USA
 Psilochorus agnosticus Chamberlin, 1924 — Mexico
 Psilochorus apicalis Banks, 1921 — USA
 Psilochorus bantus Chamberlin & Ivie, 1942 — USA
 Psilochorus bromelicola (Huber, 2019) — Brazil
 Psilochorus bruneocyaneus Mello-Leitão, 1941 — Brazil
 Psilochorus californiae Chamberlin, 1919 — USA
 Psilochorus cambridgei Gertsch & Davis, 1937 — Mexico
 Psilochorus coahuilanus Gertsch & Davis, 1937 — Mexico
 Psilochorus concinnus Gertsch, 1973 — Mexico
 Psilochorus conjunctus Gertsch & Davis, 1942 — Mexico
 Psilochorus cordatus (Bilimek, 1867) — Mexico
 Psilochorus cornutus (Keyserling, 1887) — USA
 Psilochorus delicatus Gertsch, 1971 — Mexico
 Psilochorus diablo Gertsch, 1971 — Mexico
 Psilochorus dogmaticus Chamberlin, 1924 — Mexico
 Psilochorus durangoanus Gertsch & Davis, 1937 — Mexico
 Psilochorus fishi Gertsch, 1971 — Mexico
 Psilochorus hesperus Gertsch & Ivie, 1936 — USA
 Psilochorus hooki Slowik, 2009 — USA
 Psilochorus imitatus Gertsch & Mulaik, 1940 — USA, Mexico
 Psilochorus inyo Slowik, 2009 — USA
 Psilochorus itaguyrussu Huber, Rheims & Brescovit, 2005 — Brazil
 Psilochorus minimus Schmidt, 1956 — Ecuador
 Psilochorus minutus Banks, 1898 — Mexico
 Psilochorus murphyi Gertsch, 1973 — Mexico
 Psilochorus pallidulus Gertsch, 1935 — USA, Mexico
 Psilochorus papago Gertsch & Davis, 1942 — USA, Mexico
 Psilochorus pullulus (Hentz, 1850) — New World
 Psilochorus redemptus Gertsch & Mulaik, 1940 — USA, Mexico
 Psilochorus rockefelleri Gertsch, 1935 — USA
 Psilochorus russelli Gertsch, 1971 — Mexico
 Psilochorus sectus Mello-Leitão, 1939 — Brazil
 Psilochorus simoni (Berland, 1911) — Europe
 Psilochorus sinaloa Gertsch & Davis, 1942 — Mexico
 Psilochorus taperae Mello-Leitão, 1929 — Brazil
 Psilochorus tellezi Gertsch, 1971 — Mexico
 Psilochorus texanus Slowik, 2009 — USA, Mexico
 Psilochorus topanga Chamberlin & Ivie, 1942 — USA
 Psilochorus utahensis Chamberlin, 1919 — USA
 Psilochorus ybytyriguara Huber, Rheims & Brescovit, 2005 — Brazil

Notes

References
  (1963): Spiders of The University of Kansas Natural History Reservation and Rockefeller Experimental Tract.
  (2000): New World Pholcid Spiders (Araneae: Pholcidae): A revision at generic level. Bulletin of the American Museum of Natural History 254: 1-347.  (with link to PDF)
  (2009): The world spider catalog, version 9.5. American Museum of Natural History.

External links

 Universität Bonn: Pholcidae (diagnostic photographs of P. simoni)
 BugGuide.net: Photograph of mating P. pullulus

Pholcidae
Araneomorphae genera
Spiders of North America
Spiders of Central America
Spiders of South America